American University of Cyprus is a private, American liberal arts university in Nicosia, Northern Cyprus. The language of instruction is English.

Campus
The American University of Cyprus, is located in the capital of Northern Cyprus, Nicosia.
The university is a "city university" in that it does not have a main campus; instead, colleges, departments, accommodation, and other facilities are scattered mostly throughout the Venetian walls of Nicosia and Dereboyu Avenue.

Faculties and Programs
The university is made up of three faculties and one vocational school.

Also, American University of Cyprus has a Lifelong Learning Center and a Foundation School. The Lifelong Learning Center offers courses that conform to an arts and sciences curriculum and the Foundation School operates the university's English and foundation programmes.

Memberships
American University of Cyprus is a member of the European Council for Business Education, the International Universities Search & Rescue Council, and the Cyprus Universities Association.

Notable alumni 
Ayşe Gökkan

References

External links
 American University of Cyprus website

Universities in Northern Cyprus
Education in the European Union
Universities and colleges in Cyprus
English as a global language
Education in Nicosia